The 2017 Coca-Cola GM was the 47th edition of the Greenlandic Men's Football Championship. The final round was held in Qeqertarsuaq from August 5 to 12. It was won by Inuit Timersoqatigiiffiat-79 for the first time.

Qualifying stage

North Greenland
Terianniaq-58 qualified for the final Round.

Disko Bay

NB G-44 Qeqertarsuaq qualified for the final Round as hosts.

Central Greenland

East Greenland
NB East Greenland's winner withdrew and were replaced by Kagssagssuk Maniitsoq (Central Greenland third place).

South Greenland
Kissaviarsuk-33 qualified for the final Round, but were banned and replaced by runners-up Siuteroq Nanortalik-43.

Final Round

Pool 1

Pool 2

Playoffs

Seventh-place match

Fifth-place match

Semi-finals

Third place Match

Final

See also
Football in Greenland
Football Association of Greenland
Greenland national football team
Greenlandic Men's Football Championship

References

Greenlandic Men's Football Championship seasons
Green
Green
Foot